Dhzurla waterfall is located on the Dhzurla river in the Crimean Mountains of Crimea. Waterfall has a few cascades. The word “Dhzurla” from Crimean Tatar language which means “her, who runs."

Downstream river is called Soter.

See also
 Waterfalls of Ukraine

References

Waterfalls of Crimea